In 1941, Anton Refregier won the $26,000 commission for the series History of San Francisco, which are a set of 27 murals painted in the lobby of the Rincon Annex Post Office in San Francisco, California. Refregier painted the mural with casein tempera on white gesso over plaster walls, in the social realism style. Work was interrupted by World War II and restarted in 1946; the murals were completed in 1948.

In 1953, U.S. Representative Hubert B. Scudder opened a Congressional hearing to determine whether the murals should be removed for themes "inconsistent with American ideals and principles"; the often contentious proceedings concluded with their retention. The building is now part of Rincon Center, remodeled as shops and residences after the Post Office left in 1979, and was added to the National Register of Historic Places that year. The Rincon Center lobby is publicly accessible, and regular guided tours of the murals are provided by volunteers.

History

Competition
The Section of Painting and Sculpture was created by Treasury Secretary Henry Morgenthau Jr.'s executive order of October 14, 1934 to award commissions to artists for new federal buildings; once the Rincon Annex Post Office was completed in 1940, the Section announced a competition for artists on April 12, 1941, drawing attention in the local press. Entries were required to be submitted by October 1 of that year.

Refregier was selected by a four-person jury: the Annex architect, Gilbert Underwood, and three peer artists, consisting of Victor Arnautoff, Arnold Blanch, and Philip Guston. The jury handed down a split decision, with Underwood, Arnautoff, and Blanch voting for Refregier, and Guston against. His competitors included artists Richard Haines and Wendell C. Jones, whose studies for the project were donated to the Fine Arts Museums of San Francisco in 1988; in total, there were 82 entrants for the Rincon Annex commission, including Refregier. The contract was awarded to Refregier on October 21, 1941.

Implementation
History of San Francisco was the largest mural commissioned by the federal government at the time of the award in 1941. The medium was specified in the contract to be tempera on gesso, and the murals were to be completed within three years (1,095 calendar days) of the award of the contract. Shortly after he was awarded the contract, in 1942 Refregier told the San Francisco Chronicle he wanted paint the past as it had affected the present conditions of depression, strikes, and war. Painting of the murals began in 1946, and they were completed by fall 1948.

Refregier was required to submit sketches of the planned designs for approval prior to starting work. The project sponsors requested 92 changes during the design and painting of the murals, ranging from slimming a Spanish priest (#6, "Preaching and Farming at Mission Dolores") to raising picket signs so their pro-union messages could not be read (#14, "Torchlight Procession"). An image of Franklin Roosevelt was deleted from the final panel (#27, "War and Peace") because Refregier had based it on a portrait of an aged Roosevelt after the Yalta Conference, which was seen as an "undigified way" to portray him. Refregier was resistant to the removal of Roosevelt, who was to have been in the center of the middle section of the panel, depicting the Four Freedoms: "To omit the portrait of FDR from the final panel dealing with the United Nations meeting in San Francisco, is a concession I cannot make. ... I cannot allow myself to be a victim of propaganda against a very great man."

During the painting of the murals, Refregier would be interrupted by well-meaning Post Office patrons, as he recounted in 1947: "One way I learn [about California history] is from the people who stream through the Post Office and watch me work. They look at my pictures a while, then catch my attention and start telling me exactly what my pictures mean."

Responses

The History of San Francisco murals created a heated debate because they depicted controversial events from California's past, painted in a public building using taxpayer funds. People believed that it "placed disproportionate emphasis on violence, racial hatred, and class struggle." Even before Refregier finished, the Veterans of Foreign Wars (VFW) were protesting the murals in spring 1948, specifically the panel depicting the 1934 West Coast waterfront strike (#24, "The Waterfront"), as one of the mourners was pictured with a VFW hat; VFW quartermaster adjutant H.M. "Sam" Herman went on to attack Refregier's politics and questioned the significance of the strike: "Surely there was nothing of historical significance in the waterfront riot to warrant its being commemorated as an outstanding event in the history of our city." Refregier originally had intended to depict Harry Bridges as the union leader, but changed the original design to make the leader anonymous. In response, the Public Building Administration ordered that panel covered, a decision that drew protest from the CIO longshoremen and artists' organizations.

As a compromise, Refregier removed the hat altogether, and the panel was allowed to be shown. In his private notes, Refregier despaired: "The stories in the Hearst press brought out gangs of hoodlums who were constantly under my scaffolding and I no longer worked after the sun set." 

That fall, Waldo F. Postel and his colleagues in the Native Sons of the Golden West announced they would begin campaigning for the removal of the murals: "Just what sort of paintings are these? The Communist People's World say they constitute 'a monumental series depicting California history.' We believe they constitute a monumental insult to the city, and in some panels, an outrageous attempt to arouse class hatred." Sculptor Haig Patigian called the murals 'debased' while supporting their removal.

Republican Congressmen Hubert B. Scudder and Richard Nixon were involved in Congressional attempts to have the work removed. They claimed it had a communistic tone and "defamed pioneers and reflected negatively on California's past." Many believed that "no artist, however distinguished, escaped the heavy, if well meaning, hand of federal supervision."

In a letter to the editor in 1952, the President of the College Art Association noted that "the pro-Chinese sentiments of one section of the murals and indication of the then existing wartime alliance with Russia of another section reflected the realities of the time."

1953 Congressional hearing
Congressman Scudder introduced  on March 5, 1953, calling the murals "an insult to the state, an insult to the intelligence of the public, and anti-American", adding "the murals contain subtle ridicule of characters which are supposed to represent the American people."

A hearing on the bill was held on May 1 of that year by the Subcommittee on Public Buildings and Grounds of the United States House Committee on Public Works. Scudder kicked off the meeting by reading a biographical sketch of Refregier into the record, sent from the House Committee on Un-American Activities (HUAC) on April 16, and added that opposition to the murals went back as far as 1941; he had been receiving letters opposed to the murals since his first year in Congress, 1949, sent from organizations like the Native Sons of the Golden West and the American Legion, who claimed the murals "do not truly depict the romance and glory of early California history; but on the contrary cast a most derogatory and improper reflection upon the character of the pioneers, and that other murals are definitely subversive and designed to spread communistic propaganda and tend to promote racial hatred and class warfare".

Congressman Donald L. Jackson was the next witness to be called. Jackson had replaced Nixon on HUAC after the latter's Senate election, but Jackson claimed he was not officially representing HUAC interests for the subcommittee hearing, despite reading additional details about Refregier's activities both before and after the completion of the murals into the record. Under questioning from Subcommittee Chairman James C. Auchincloss, Jackson admitted he had "seen photographic duplications" but had "not personally seen the murals" before calling them "not truly representative of the history of California", adding "if they were in the Capitol of the United States I would join in protesting them." The HUAC dossiers of Arnautoff and Blanch, the jurors supporting the selection of Refregier, were also read into the record; it was noted that Guston, who had opposed the selection, did not have a HUAC record. Scudder then passed around black-and-white photographs of the murals and provided specific criticism for each one, singling out the depiction of indigenous people ("strong features, muscles, and physique ... [not] a true picture of the aborigines of the West"), Spanish explorers and priests ("big-bellied", "warlike", and "objectionable to people who appreciate ... those who developed California and brought civilization to the west coast"), pioneer settlers ("cadaverous, soulless Americans" and a "moronic assemblage of people"), and gold miners ("depicting the thing which the Communists claim, we are only seeking the golden riches in our mode of life"), among others.

In defense of the murals, John F. Shelley and William S. Mailliard, the two congressmen representing San Francisco, questioned the attacks on the historical accuracy of the murals and whether they were truly glorifying subversive themes. Questioning the presence of hammer and sickle imagery in the final panel (#27, "War and Peace") Subcommittee Member J. Harry McGregor had a brief exchange with Mailliard:

Later in the defense, a statement from Warren Howell was read into the record, providing "recognizable sources which are authoritative and authentic" for many of the scenes depicted in the murals. The murals were also vigorously defended by a group of artists and museum directors, including the directors of three prominent San Francisco art museums wrote statements supporting the artistic merit of the murals: Walter Heil (Director of the de Young Museum), Thomas Carr Howe Jr. (California Palace of the Legion of Honor), and Grace McCann Morley (San Francisco Museum of Art). Howe added that due to the delicate egg tempera technique used, the murals could not be removed without great care and expense. A list of more than 300 citizens and organizations opposing the removal included support from the Museum of Modern Art (New York), American Federation of Arts, and Artists' Equity. Mailliard said the selection of Refregier was "unfortunate", but added "Many of these arguments for and against removal of the murals seem to me to be without validity. ... Judging either the painter or the style of art used would be putting the Congress in the same position as the totalitarian governments who refuse to allow music to be played if the composer's politics do not suit them." 

Scudder's bill never made it out of committee, despite a vote of support from the California State Senate. A local newspaper, the Sausalito News, chided Scudder to "leave the S.F. Postoffice Murals alone and come back into your own bailiwick". While running for re-election in 1954, Scudder's opponent Max Kortum noted that Scudder was best known for failing to remove the murals, calling him a misguided patriot and comparing him to "a child who marches in a parade holding up the American flag". Scudder won re-election and continued to insist the murals were "very obnoxious to people in the area", claiming that an analysis showed parts of them were "definitely Communist propaganda" in 1957.

Preservation and restoration
All of the mail collected in San Francisco was taken to Rincon Annex for distribution. After the Post Office moved the mail distribution facilities to India Basin, vacating the space in 1979, preservationists including Emmy Lou Packard rallied again to save the murals; the building was added to the National Register of Historic Places that year. San Francisco named added the building to its Designated Landmarks (#107) in 1980. A proposed conversion to what would become the Rincon Center shopping, dining, and residential complex was unveiled in 1983; under the proposal, the building's exterior and interior would be preserved intact while adding two floors and two towers.

During the conversion, Thomas Portué restored the murals in 1987. Portué again restored the murals in 2014, alongside his daughter Nicole, and is the ongoing custodian of the murals.

Design

Subjects
The mural panels depicted various historical events from California's past, and was meant to span all of human history, from an early Native American creating art (#1, planned title: "In the Beginning, Waters Covered All Earth Except Mount Diabalo ") to the Golden Gate International Exposition (#26, planned title: "Chinatown—The Fair, 1946"). In between, other panels would include the California Gold Rush, the 1877 anti-Chinese Sand Lot riots, the 1860s building by Union Pacific of the western First transcontinental railroad, the disastrous 1906 San Francisco earthquake and fire, the trial of trade unionist Tom Mooney for the Preparedness Day Bombing, the 1934 San Francisco Waterfront Strike, the city's Second World War contributions, culminating in the 1945 signing of the United Nations Charter in the San Francisco War Memorial Opera House. 

Refregier used these topics, including the tragedies, as inspiration. Refregier "believed that art must address itself to contemporary issues and that a mural painting in particular must not be 'banal, decorative embellishment', but a 'meaningful, significant, powerful plastic statement based on the history and lives of the people. As Brian N. Wallis noted in a 1977 catalog of Refregier's work, "Refregier had recourse to two interpretations of California history, these being the glorious, romantic vision of folk tales, or the realistic depiction of the hardships and struggles of the early settlers. Refregier selected the realistic representation as being more interesting and more dramatic. This deviation from the accepted, or preferred, view of history was the source of much of the dispute over the murals". Some suspected Refregier of being a communist because of his Russian–USSR background, and his mural topics about social issues.

Notes

Style
The style of this historic mural had many of Refregier's key characteristics. The palette was composed of yellows, browns, and grays, punctuated by red in certain areas to evoke emotion. Earthy tones and the lack of bright colors remind viewers of the struggles and hardships he is depicting. Refregier also uses white to represent virtue in those inspired by a cause. His style is very flat and one-dimensional. He uses solid blocks of color to denote shadows, along with depth and shade. His painting style appears to be very rudimentary and simple, but complex because of the way he uses color to evoke emotion and powerful images to tell a story.

In other media
 The cover art for In the Interest of Others: Organizations and Social Activism (by John Ahlquist and Margaret Levi, 2013) is derived from Panel #24 ("The Waterfront"), via a simplified silkscreen print prepared c.1949, itself notable as the most widely reproduced print of the mural set.

See also 

 Life of Washington (1936) — Mural by Victor Arnautoff which San Francisco School Board attempted to destroy in 2019
 Man at the Crossroads (1934) — Mural by Diego Rivera destroyed over its communist themes

References

Additional sources

 "Anton Refregier's Murals in the Rincon Post Office Annex, San Francisco: A Marxist History of California", by Darren Paul Trebel, A Thesis presented to the Graduate Faculty of the University of Virginia, McIntire Department of Art History, University of Virginia, May 1992.

External links

 
 
 Historical images, via the San Francisco Public Library:
 
  Includes preliminary designs from 1941.

1940s murals
Murals in San Francisco
Paintings by Anton Refregier
1940s in San Francisco